Lanard Dsouza (born 6 June 1937) is a novelist and writer in Kannada language living in Sagara, Karnataka, India. He was selected as the President of 80th Kannada Sahitya Sammelana held in Madikeri in the year 2014.

Personal life
Na D'Souza was born in Sagara, Karnataka on 6 June 1937. He completed his primary education at St. Joseph's higher primary school and higher studies at Sahyadri College, Shimoga. He worked in the Karnataka Public Works Department for 37 years. He is married to Philomena D' Souza and has 3 children - Shobha, Naveen and Santhosh.

Na D'Souza has written more than 40 novels, many short stories, plays and literature for children and total number of his published books cross 94. He has received Central Sahitya Academy's Bala Sahitya Puraskar for his children novel Mulugadeya Oorige Bandavaru. He has been writing in Kannada for more than three decades and his two novels Dweepa and Kadina Benki were made into motion pictures and won National awards. He also participated in agitations of public interest. Some of his works like Dweepa have been translated into English.

Accolades 
 Karnataka Sahitya Academy award - 1993
 Karnataka Rajyotsava Award - 1998
 Alwas Nudisiri Award - 2006
 Honorary Doctorate (D.Lit) by Kuvempu University

References

Bibliography

Kannada-language writers
Novelists from Karnataka
People from Shimoga district
Kannada people
1937 births
Living people
20th-century Indian novelists